Libby Squire (1 January 1998 – 1 February 2019) was a university student who disappeared following a night out with friends on 31 January 2019 in Kingston upon Hull in the East Riding of Yorkshire, England. In the days following her disappearance, Humberside Police and Squire's parents made a public appeal for information. Police undertook door-to-door enquiries in areas of Hull near to where Squire lived and had last been seen, as well as searching bins, drains and the partially frozen Beverley and Barmston Drain for evidence.

On 6 February, just under a week after Squire disappeared, 24-year-old Pawel Relowicz was arrested on suspicion of her abduction after CCTV showed his silver Vauxhall Astra in the area when she went missing. On 10 February, he was charged with five unrelated sexual and burglary offences, committed between December 2017 and January 2019, but was not at the time charged with any offences in relation to the disappearance of Squire.

On 20 March, approximately seven weeks after Squire disappeared, a woman's body was discovered by fishermen in the Humber Estuary, close to Grimsby docks. The following day, this was identified as being the body of Squire. It was not possible for police to determine the cause of death, as a result of how long the body had been in the water.

On 24 October, Relowicz was charged with the rape and murder of Squire. On 11 February 2021, he was convicted of both offences and sentenced to life imprisonment, with a minimum of 27 years before he will be eligible for parole.

Background and disappearance
Liberty Anna Squire was born on 1 January 1998, and grew up in West Wycombe, Buckinghamshire. At the time of her death, she was studying philosophy at the University of Hull.

On the evening of 31 January 2019, 21-year-old Squire was on a night out with friends. At around 11:20 pm she was refused entry to The Welly, a music venue and nightclub in central Hull, because door staff thought she was too intoxicated. As a result, her friends called a taxi to take her to her home in Wellesley Avenue, which dropped her off at around 11:30 pm. However, she did not enter her house. Ten minutes later she was seen about half a mile away on Beverley Road. A series of witnesses saw Squire "crying and sobbing" in the street. Some attempted to assist her, but found she was incoherent and aggressive and they eventually gave up.

Investigation
The search for Libby Squire was the largest missing person search in the history of Humberside Police. In the days following Squire's disappearance, her parents, Russell and Lisa Squire, made a public appeal for information and for her return. More than 100 police officers and staff searched for evidence, while specialist teams searched nearby bodies of water, including the River Hull and the Beverley and Barmston Drain.

24-year-old Pawel Relowicz was arrested on 6 February on suspicion of Squire's abduction. As part of the investigation, he was charged with voyeurism, outraging public decency and burglary offences. These charges related to a string of sexually motivated offences committed between June 2017 and December 2018, and were unrelated to Squire. They included Relowicz masturbating in public, spying on women in their homes and stealing sex toys, underwear and cash during burglaries. On 13 August, he pleaded guilty to nine offences at Sheffield Crown Court and on 16 August was sentenced to eight and a half years' imprisonment.

Squire's body was found by a fisherman in the Humber Estuary almost two months after she went missing, on 20 March. The body was so severely decomposed that it was not possible to determine the cause of death. On 24 October, while still imprisoned for the previous sexual and burglary offences, Relowicz was charged with the rape and murder of Squire.

Trial
On 31 October, Pawel Relowicz appeared before Kingston upon Hull Crown Court charged with rape and murder. He was remanded in custody, and a provisional trial date was set for June 2020 at Sheffield Crown Court.

The trial eventually commenced on 12 January 2021 and lasted four-and-a-half weeks. The Crown, prosecuting, contended that Relowicz had been in the centre of Hull "looking for an opportunity" on the night of 31 January 2019. When he came across Squire, drunk and possibly suffering from hypothermia, he invited or forced her into his car with the intention of committing a sexual offence. The prosecution claimed he then took Squire to Oak Road playing fields, a nearby open space, where he raped and subsequently murdered her. He then disposed of her body in the River Hull. Scratches to Relowicz's face were evidence she had tried to defend herself. The prosecution also highlighted Relowicz's history of sexual and sexually motivated offending in the 18 months before the murder, claiming he was a man with "uncontrollable sexual urges".

In his defence, Relowicz claimed to be a "good Samaritan" and that he only stopped to offer help to the visibly intoxicated Squire. He said he drove her to Oak Road playing fields, where they hugged, kissed and had consensual sex. When she tried to kiss him again, he turned away, as a result of which she scratched his face. He claimed he then left her at the playing fields, and drove off in search of "attractive women". He admitted committing one further public sex act that night, but denied he was sexually excited as a result of Squire's murder. During the trial, extracts from Squire's medical records were read to the jury, showing she had previously experienced suicidal thoughts which included thoughts of drowning herself in a river.

On 11 February, after six days of deliberation, the jury found Relowicz guilty of both the rape and murder of Squire, unanimously on the charge of rape and by a majority of 11 to one on the charge of murder. The following day, 12 February, Relowicz was sentenced at the same court to life imprisonment with the possibility of parole after 27 years for Squire's murder. He was sentenced to a concurrent term of 18 years' imprisonment for her rape. In her sentencing remarks, the judge, Mrs Justice Lambert, agreed with the description of Relowicz's crimes as a "perverted campaign of sexually deviant behaviour", and of him as a "very dangerous individual".

Aftermath
Following the trial, the Attorney General's Office was asked to examine Relowicz's sentence under the unduly lenient sentence scheme, which allows members of the public to request that a sentence handed down in the Crown Court is reconsidered. In March 2021, it concluded Relowicz's sentence was not unduly lenient and so it would not ask the Court of Appeal to reconsider it.

After her daughter's murder, Squire's mother, Lisa Squire, began publicly advocating for men convicted of non-contact sexual offences, such as voyeurism, to be given tougher sentences as well as therapy. Her campaign claims this will prevent sex offenders escalating to more serious offences of rape and murder, as happened with Relowicz and other contemporaneous high-profile offenders, such as Wayne Couzens. In March 2022, she met Prime Minister Boris Johnson, who was reportedly sympathetic to her cause. In October 2022, it was reported that Lisa Squire was to meet her daughter's murderer in prison; Relowicz later withdrew his consent for the meeting.

Pawel Relowicz

Pawel Relowicz was born on 25 June 1994, in Warszewice in northern Poland. He came to the United Kingdom in 2015. At the time of the murder he was employed as a butcher, working for Karro Food Group at a meat processing plant in Malton, North Yorkshire.

Relowicz was married, having met his wife Jagoda on a dating website in 2016. They met in person on only a few occasions before she moved from Poland to live with him in Hull. The couple had two children. They separated following his conviction, and she returned to Poland. At the time of Squire's murder, Relowicz had no criminal record and was not known to police. However, since 2017 he had been committing an escalating series of sexual offences and sexually motivated burglaries in Hull. In July 2017, a woman sharing an "intimate moment" with her boyfriend spotted him spying on them through her ground-floor bedroom window. In December of that year, he broke into a house and stole three vibrators. He also stole cash, sex toys, condoms, clothing and electronics in separate burglaries.

In January 2019, less than three weeks before Squire's murder, Relowicz publicly masturbated in front of groups of women on two separate occasions. In one of these incidents, he followed the women home and ejaculated onto the front door of their house. Although he left substantial forensic evidence at the scene of many of these offences, Relowicz was not identified because he had no criminal record and so his DNA and fingerprints were not available to police. He was only linked to these earlier crimes after he was arrested in February 2019.

At the time of his arrest, Relowicz was found to be in possession of a pink holdall containing sex toys, female underwear and photographs of women, all of which he had stolen in burglaries. His semen and saliva were found on some of the items. During his trial for the rape and murder of Squire, Relowicz accepted he had a "problem" controlling his sexual urges.

See also
List of solved missing person cases

References

2019 in England
2019 murders in the United Kingdom
2010s in Kingston upon Hull
2010s missing person cases
2010s trials
February 2019 crimes in Europe
February 2019 events in the United Kingdom
Missing person cases in England
Murder trials
Rape in the 2010s
Rape in Yorkshire
Trials in England
Violence against women in England